Fedde de Jong (born 13 June 2003) is a Dutch professional footballer who plays as a midfielder for Dutch club AZ Alkmaar.

Club career
He made his professional debut with Jong AZ in a 1–1 Eerste Divisie tie with SC Telstar on 2 November 2020.

References

External links
 
 Ons Oranje U17 Profile

2003 births
Footballers from North Holland
Living people
People from Uitgeest
Dutch footballers
Netherlands youth international footballers
Association football midfielders
Jong AZ players
AZ Alkmaar players
Eerste Divisie players
Eredivisie players